The high commissioner of the United Kingdom to New Zealand is the United Kingdom's foremost diplomatic representative in New Zealand, and head of the UK's diplomatic mission in New Zealand. As the United Kingdom and New Zealand are fellow members of the Commonwealth of Nations, their diplomatic relations are at governmental level, rather than between heads of state. Thus, the countries exchange high commissioners, rather than ambassadors.

The British high commissioner to New Zealand is also the non-resident governor of the Pitcairn, Henderson, Ducie and Oeno Islands, a British Overseas Territory, and formerly non-resident high commissioner to the Independent State of Samoa. Besides the high commission in Wellington, the UK government maintains a consulate general in Auckland.

List of high commissioners

The following persons have served as British high commissioner to New Zealand since 1939:

1939–1945: Sir Harry Batterbee
1945–1949: Sir Patrick Duff
1949–1953: Sir Roy Price
1953–1957: General Sir Geoffry Scoones
1957–1959: Sir George Mallaby
1959–1963: Sir Francis Cumming-Bruce
1969–1973: Sir Arthur Galsworthy
1973–1975: Sir David Aubrey Scott
1976–1980: Sir Harold Smedley
1980–1984: Sir Richard Stratton
1984–1987: Terence Daniel O'Leary
1987–1990: Robin Byatt
1990–1994: Sir David Moss
1994–1998: Robert Alston
1998–2001: Martin Williams
2001–2006: Richard Fell
2006–2010: George Fergusson
2010–2014: Victoria Treadell
2014–2017: Jonathan Sinclair
2018–2022: Laura Clarke

2022–: Iona Thomas

See also
List of high commissioners of New Zealand to the United Kingdom

References

External links

UK and New Zealand, gov.uk

New Zealand
 
United Kingdom
United Kingdom High Commissioners
 
United Kingdom High Commissioners
1970 establishments in the Pitcairn Islands
 
United Kingdom and the Commonwealth of Nations